James Lee Kearney (born January 21, 1943 in Wharton, Texas) is a former American football safety who played twelve seasons in the National Football League and the American Football League from 1965-1976.  In college, he played quarterback for Prairie View A&M, where one of his wide receivers was future Kansas City Chiefs teammate Otis Taylor.  He was drafted in the 11th round of the 1965 NFL Draft by the Detroit Lions.  He then played for the Chiefs from 1967 through 1975 and for the New Orleans Saints in 1976.  He started in Super Bowl IV for the Kansas City Chiefs. In 1972, he tied an NFL record by returning four interceptions for touchdowns.  He also led the league with 192 yards on interception returns.  He wore jersey number 46 while with the Chiefs. In retirement, he has taken up golf and coached little league football in the Kansas City area. Jim taught science for many years at Washington High School in Kansas, City, Kansas.

References

See also
Other American Football League players

1943 births
Living people
People from Wharton, Texas
American football safeties
Prairie View A&M Panthers football players
Detroit Lions players
Kansas City Chiefs players
New Orleans Saints players
Players of American football from Texas
American Football League players